Chil Sar (also Romanized as Chīl Sar; also known as Chīleh Sar, Nīlag, and Tembū’ī) is a village in Sand-e Mir Suiyan Rural District, Dashtiari District, Chabahar County, Sistan and Baluchestan Province, Iran. At the 2006 census, its population was 209, in 44 families.

References 

Populated places in Dashtiari County